Blondie is a radio situation comedy adapted from the long-running Blondie comic strip by Chic Young. It stars Arthur Lake as Dagwood Bumstead and, for the majority of its run, Penny Singleton as Blondie Bumstead. The radio program ran on several networks from 1939 to 1950.

Broadcast history
In 1938, Penny Singleton and Arthur Lake were cast in the Columbia Pictures film Blondie.  The film was a box office success and a long-running film series went into production, lasting until 1950 and featuring twenty-eight feature films.  As part of the promotion for the first film, Singleton and Lake appeared as Blondie and Dagwood on the December 20, 1938 episode of The Pepsodent Show radio program, which starred Bob Hope.

The appearance with Hope led to their own show, beginning July 3, 1939, on CBS as a summer replacement for The Eddie Cantor Show. However, Cantor did not return in the fall, so the sponsor, R.J. Reynolds' Camel cigarettes chose to keep Blondie on the air Mondays at 7:30 p.m. Camel remained the sponsor until June 26, 1944.
 
In 1944, Blondie was on the NBC Blue Network, sponsored by Colgate-Palmolive's Super Suds, airing Fridays at 7 p.m. from July 21 to September 1. The final three weeks of that run overlapped with Blondie'''s return to CBS on Sundays at 8pm from August 13, 1944, to September 26, 1948, still sponsored by Super Suds. Beginning in mid-1945, the 30-minute program was heard Mondays at 7:30 p.m. Super Suds continued as the sponsor when the show moved to NBC on Wednesdays at 8 p.m. from October 6, 1948, to June 29, 1949.

Early in 1949, Colgate executive Bob Healy notified Singleton that the company desired "a different interpretation of the character", and an agency began auditioning actresses to be the new Blondie. Ann Rutherford replaced her as the voice of Blondie. In October 1949, Patricia Lake, the real life wife of Arthur Lake took the role. Alice White was also heard as radio's Blondie.

In its final season, the series was on ABC as a sustaining program from October 6, 1949, to July 6, 1950, first airing Thursdays at 8 p.m. and then (from May) 8:30 p.m. The radio show ended the same year as the Blondie film series.

Arthur Lake would later return to the role of Dagwood in the 1957 television series Blondie opposite Pamela Britton as Blondie.

Cast
Blondie Bumstead - Penny Singleton (1939 - 1949) / Ann Rutherford (1949) / Patricia Lake (1949 - 1950) / Alice White
Dagwood Bumstead - Arthur Lake
Alexander Bumstead - Leone Ledoux (1939 - 1943) / Tommy Cook (1943 - 1946) / Larry Simms (1946 - 1949) / Jeffrey Silver (1949 - 1950)
Cookie Bumstead - Leone Ledoux (1939 - 1946) / Marlene Aames (1946) / Norma Jean Nilsson (1947) / Joan Rae (1948 - 1950)
J.C. Dithers - Hanley Stafford
Mrs. Dithers - Elvia Allman
Herb Woodley - Frank Nelson / Harold Peary (Herb Woodley)
Mr. Fuddle - Arthur Q. Bryan / Harry Lang
Alvin Fuddle - Dix Davis
Harriet - Mary Jane Croft
Dimples Wilson - Veola Vonn / Lurene Tuttle
Announcer - Bill Goodwin / Howard Petrie / Harlow Wilcox
Additional cast (1939) - Rosemary DeCamp, Ed MacDonald, Hans Conreid

Crew
Producer - Tom McKnight, Ashmead Scott
Directors - Eddie Pola, Don Bernard, Glenhall Taylor
Writers - Ashmead Scott, William Moore, Johnny Greene (1940)
Music - Harry Lubin, Billy Artz, Lou Kosloff
Sound Effects - Ray Erlenborn (CBS series) / Parker Cornel (NBC series)

References

Listen to
Internet Archive: Blondie (42 episodes)

Further readingBlondie Goes to Hollywood,'' by Carol Lynn Scherling. Albany, 2010. BearManor Media. .

External links
The Definitive: Blondie article and log
Thrilling Days of Yesteryear: Blondie

American comedy radio programs
1939 radio programme debuts
1950 radio programme endings
Radio programs based on comic strips
CBS Radio programs
NBC Blue Network radio programs
NBC radio programs
ABC radio programs
Blondie (comic strip)
1930s American radio programs
1940s American radio programs
1950s American radio programs
Radio programs about families